The following highways are numbered 328:

Australia 
 - Cameron Drive (No through road)

Canada
 Nova Scotia Route 328

China
 China National Highway 328

Costa Rica
 National Route 328

Japan
 Japan National Route 328

United States
  Arkansas Highway 328
 Florida:
  Florida State Road 328 (former)
  County Road 328 (Marion County, Florida)
  Georgia State Route 328
  Kentucky Route 328
  Louisiana Highway 328
  Maryland Route 328
  Mississippi Highway 328
  Montana Secondary Highway 328
 New York:
  New York State Route 328
 New York State Route 328A (former)
  County Route 328 (Erie County, New York)
  Ohio State Route 328
  Pennsylvania Route 328
  Puerto Rico Highway 328
  Tennessee State Route 328
 Texas:
  Texas State Highway 328 (former)
  Texas State Highway Loop 328
  Farm to Market Road 328
  Virginia State Route 328
 Virginia State Route 328 (former)